Danish Abrar is an Indian politician from Indian National Congress who is the member of 15th Rajasthan Assembly. He is the son of Abrar Ahmed.

References 

Rajasthan MLAs 2018–2023
Indian politicians
 Living people
Year of birth missing (living people)